Sundankottai is a Village in Thoothukudi District  in the Indian state of Tamil Nadu. It is a small village situated near Udangudi.

Administration
Sundankottai comes under Pallakurichi Panchayat, Srivaikuntam Legislative Assembly and Thoothukudi Lok Sabha constituency

Notable People from Sundankottai
Dr.N.S.Chandra Bose, Former President of IMA (1991-1992) and former President of BJP, Tamil Nadu (1993-1995)
 M. A. Ganesa Pandian, Former Janata Party Leader Tamil Nadu, MLA candidate 1984 & 1991, Sathankulam Union Chairman, Pallakurichi Panchayat President.
T. S. Balaiah - Tamil film actor
 F. V. Arul, former I.G of police and Director of C.B.I.
 A.Ramasamy Nadar, former S.I of police and D.S.P of CB-CID.
 K.Neethi Ragavan, General Manager (Retd), Issue Department - Reserve Bank of India, Chennai.
 Naveen Raja Jacob - India men's national volleyball team (2007 – present).
Sattanathan Mohan - MD SETC,  Tamil Nadu State Transport Department
 Vairavanathan Piramiah - Chief Engineer, WRD, Plan Formation Tamil Nadu Public Works Department, Chennai.

Gallery

References

Villages in Thoothukudi district